Giovanni Servi (1800 – 1885) was an Italian painter of the Romantic period.

He was born in Venice, but died in Milan. He was an adjunct professor along with Giuseppe Sogni in the Brera. He was strongly influenced by Hayez and Palagi. He mainly painted historical canvases.

Sources

1800 births
1885 deaths
19th-century Italian painters
Italian male painters
Painters from Milan
Italian romantic painters
19th-century Italian male artists